Evgenia Arbugaeva (born 1985) is a photographer of the Russian Arctic. Having grown up in Yakutsk, she has an empathy with the people living in the far north and the difficult living conditions they experience, and several of her photographic projects have involved them. The National Geographic has funded her to photograph the people and economic changes on Russia's northern coast.

Early life and education
Arbugaeva was born in Tiksi, a small port town of the Sakha Republic on the Arctic Sea, near the mouth of the Lena River. As part of the Soviet Union, Tiksi supported military airfields and became the world's most northern settlement with over 5000 people. Her memories of the place include pink mountains, whiteout snowstorms in which she lost all sense of place, fields of snow colored green or gold by the surrounding light, and auroras in the endless night of winter. One of her childhood heroes was explorer Jacques Cousteau. At the age of eight, and at the fall of the Soviet Union, she and her family moved to Yakutsk, "the coldest city on earth" and a place that she found much less visually appealing. She studied management in Moscow before moving to New York City. There, she studied photography at the International Center of Photography, graduating in 2009. 19 years after moving from her hometown, Arbugaeva decided to move back to Tiksi because she could no longer remember anything from the town. These memories had faded so much to the point where they seemed unreal.

Photography
Arbugaeva's photographic method involves living with her subjects on a long enough term to become friends with them and for them to relax in front of her camera. For instance, in one of her projects she traveled with Siberian hunters for the tusks of mammoths, newly exposed by global warming. She won the trust of the hunters by stitching up the injured hand of the head of the group. She often works without a camera, scouting locations that she returns to frequently until the lighting and inspiration combine to give her a photo.

In 2010 Arbugaeva returned to Tiksi, now becoming a ghost town, on a personal visit to compare it to her memories, but left the town with only one photo she liked, of a teenage girl playing on the seashore. Inspired by the photo, she traveled back to Tiksi in 2011 to meet the girl and her family and to document their daily life, overlain with her own memories. Despite the decline of the town and the difficult life there (which drove her host family to plan their own departure), her photos in this project are "bright and whimsical, their compositions and vivid colours redolent of the books she read there as a child".

Arbugaeva learned of the weather stations of northern Russia in a dog sledding incident, when she and her father had to take shelter from bad weather at one of the stations. In her project "Weather Man", she took a two-month passage on an icebreaker to 22 of the stations, including the station at Khodovarikha, where she met meteorologist Vyacheslav (Slava) Korotki. The portrait taken of Vyacheslav Korotki is an intimate story of an individualistic man, who is facing the fading winter of the Arctic. In early 2014, she returned to Khodovarikha by helicopter for a two-and-a-half-week visit and photography session with Korotki. Based on this work, a much darker series of photos than the ones from Tiksi, she published a profile of Korotki in The New Yorker.

Arbugaeva's other photography projects have included nomadic Yakut reindeer herders in Sakha,
and "Amani", a sequence of fictionalized images set on an abandoned anthropological research station on a former German coffee plantation in Tanzania.

Recognition
Arbugaeva is the 2013 winner of Leica's Oskar Barnack Award for her work in Tiksi, for which she also received a Magnum Foundation International Emergency Fund grant in 2012. In 2018, National Geographic named her as one of their four inaugural Media Innovation Fellows, funding her to photograph the people and economic changes on Russia's northern coast.

In 2022, her film Haulout with her brother Maxim Arbugaev, about walruses, was featured by The New Yorker. It won Best Short Documentary award at the IDA Documentary Awards, and was nominated for the Academy Award for Best Documentary Short Film.

References

External links

1985 births
Living people
The New Yorker people
Russian photographers
Russian women photographers
People from Bulunski District
Yakut people